"Ramrod" is a song written and performed by Bruce Springsteen for his fifth album, The River, released in 1980. It was recorded at The Power Station in New York on June 12, 1979. The song was written and originally recorded on September 12, 1977, for Springsteen's Darkness on the Edge of Town album, but that recording was not used for its release on The River.

Although "Ramrod" was never released as the A-side of a single, it reached #30 on the Billboard Hot Mainstream Rock Tracks chart in 1981. It has remained a popular song in concerts by Bruce Springsteen with the E Street Band, with about 410 performances through 2008, and appearing on both the CD and DVD versions of Live in New York City.

In the Netherlands, "Ramrod" was released as the B-side of the "Point Blank" single in 1981. In other countries it was released as the B-side of "The River".

Personnel
According to authors Philippe Margotin and Jean-Michel Guesdon:

Bruce Springsteen – vocals, guitars
Roy Bittan – piano
Clarence Clemons – saxophone, tambourine
Danny Federici – organ
Garry Tallent – bass
Steven Van Zandt – guitars, vocal harmonies
Max Weinberg – drums
The band – handclaps

References

External links
 Lyrics & Audio clips from Brucespringsteen.net

Bruce Springsteen songs
1980 songs
Songs written by Bruce Springsteen
Song recordings produced by Jon Landau
Song recordings produced by Bruce Springsteen
Song recordings produced by Steven Van Zandt